Basketball Nymburk, also known as ERA Nymburk due to sponsorship reasons, is a professional basketball team that is based in the town of Nymburk. The club plays in the top-tier level professional Czech National League (NBL). Nymburk regularly plays in European competitions, as it last participated in the Basketball Champions League.

Basketball Nymburk is by far the most important team in national league, as it has won every league title since the 2003–04 season. It plays its domestic competitions in Sportovní centrum Nymburk and the international matches in Královka Arena in Prague.

History
ČEZ won the Czech National League championship, from 2004 to 2019, and has also played in several European-wide basketball competitions, including the European 2nd-tier level EuroCup. Some of the club's former players include Darius Washington, former NCAA champion and NBA player George Zidek, who is the team's current press speaker, and naturalized Czech player Maurice Whitfield.

Trophies
Czech National League
Champions (19): 2004, 2005, 2006, 2007, 2008, 2009, 2010, 2011, 2012, 2013, 2014, 2015, 2016, 2017, 2018, 2019, 2020, 2021, 2022
Czech Cup: 
Winners (15): 2004, 2005, 2007, 2008, 2009, 2010, 2011, 2012, 2013, 2014, 2017, 2018, 2019, 2020, 2021

Current roster

Season by season

Notable players

Head coaches
  Muli Katzurin
  Ronen Ginzburg
  Kęstutis Kemzūra
  Oren Amiel

Notes

References

External links
Official Site 
EuroCup Team Page
Eurobasket.com BC Nymburk Page
EuroCup Club Profile

Nymburk
Basketball teams in the Czech Republic
Basketball teams established in 1930
1930 establishments in Czechoslovakia